Chauncy Dennison Harris (1914 - December 26, 2003) was a pioneer of modern geography. His seminal works in the field of American urban geography ("The Nature of Cities" and "A Functional Classification of Cities in the United States") along with his work on the Soviet Union during and after the Cold War era established him as one of the world's foremost urban geographers. He also made significant contributions to the geographical study of ethnicity, specifically with respect to non-Russian minorities living within the Soviet Union. Harris traveled regularly to the Soviet Union and played a key role in establishing a healthy dialog between Soviet and American scholars.

Life and career
Harris was born in 1914 in Logan, Utah. The son of Academian Franklin S. Harris, he showed an early interest in Geography, declaring to his family at the end of second grade that he was going to become a geographer. He graduated from Brigham Young High School in Provo in 1930.  He received a B.A. from Brigham Young University (BYU) in 1933. The valedictorian of his class, Harris became the first Rhodes Scholar from BYU. The scholarship took him to Oxford where he completed a second B.A. as well as a Master's Degree. He also received an M.A. from the London School of Economics before returning to the U.S. He completed his Ph.D. at the University of Chicago in 1940. His dissertation was entitled, "Salt Lake City - a Regional Capital in 1940."

After brief stints at Indiana University and the University of Nebraska, Harris was appointed Assistant Professor of Geography at the University of Chicago in 1943. Around this same time he was called into military service with the U.S. Department of State, Office of the Geographer. Later, in 1943–44, he served the country in the Office of Strategic Services.  In Washington he became intrigued by the mystery surrounding the Soviet Union. He started studying Russian and exploring the available cartographic and statistical information about the country. He published his first two works on the Soviet Union in 1945. His early work in this area left him well prepared in the late 1950s when the Soviet Union began opening up to foreigners. By the time of his first visit, he was already a well established and respected expert in the field. Over the course of his career, he made 14 trips to the Soviet Union and played an important role in fostering and promoting collaboration between American and Russian geographers.

In addition to his work on the Soviet Union, Harris made several important contributions to the field of American Urban Geography. In particular, in 1945 he wrote "The Nature of Cities" with Edward Ullman. The paper, published in the Annals of the American Academy of Political and Social Science, described the Multiple nuclei model of urban development, which had prophetic relevance for understanding American cities in the later 20th century. This model gives a suggestion as to the possible land use within a city. It is an alternative model to the Concentric zone model and the Sector model.

During his professional career Harris held a number of important and prestigious positions including dean of the Division of the Social Sciences at the University of Chicago (1954-1960). He served on the University of Chicago faculty from 1943 to 1984 and then continued as the Samuel N. Harper Distinguished Service Professor Emeritus in Geography until his death in 2003.

Awards and honors
 President of the Association of American Geographers (1957)
 President of the American Association for the Advancement of Slavic Studies (1962)
 Councilor of the American Geographical Society from 1961 to 1974
 Secretary-general and treasurer of the International Geographical Union (1968-1976)
 Vice President of the American Geographical Society from 1969 to 1974
 Longtime member of the editorial board of the American Geographical Society's Geographical Review
 Was a key player in the founding of the American Geographical Society's Soviet Geography
 Co-editor of Soviet Geography for many years
 In 1985 the American Geographical Society awarded him The Cullum Geographical Medal
 In 1987 the Royal Geographical Society awarded him the Victoria Medal

See also 
 Geographers on Film

References

External links
 Chronicle from Chicago university
 An appreciation
 Chauncy Harris, 89, Geographer Of a Little-Known Soviet Union
 Chauncy Harris, noted geographer
 Chauncy D. Harris (1914-2003), geographer extraordinaire*.(GEOGRAPHICAL RECORD)(Obituary)
 Guide to the Chauncy D. Harris Papers

American geographers
1914 births
2003 deaths
American Rhodes Scholars
Brigham Young University alumni
University of Chicago alumni
University of Chicago faculty
Recipients of the Cullum Geographical Medal
Alumni of Lincoln College, Oxford
People from Logan, Utah
Presidents of the American Association of Geographers
Urban geographers
Victoria Medal recipients
20th-century geographers